Kesugi Ridge Trail is a through hike in Denali State Park, Alaska, United States. While there are many hiking trails in Alaska, Kesugi Ridge offers views and unique geological features. When the weather is right, visitors can see Denali, the tallest mountain in North America.

There are four different access points along the Parks Highway from mile 137.6 to mile 163.9. The trail starts below treeline of spruce trees, and works it way up to the alpine tundra, along the ridge. This hike can be considered difficult because of the elevation gain and necessary boulder hopping. The trail crosses hills and valleys. While the hike is not as popular as hikes such as Flattop, the trail is established. Along the entire trail are cairns marking the route.

With the choice of four different starting/ending points hikers can tailor their hike. Visitors can check with the Park to ensure that the Troublesome Creek Trail-head is not closed for flooding, which is a common occurrence in the summer. The Ermine Hill Trail-head offers day hikers an option of experiencing a part of the Kesugi Ridge Trail without having to make it into an overnight hike. This route is a fairly easy 6.2 miles round trip and hikers can experience the rock formations and a small lake at the end of the trail. The Byers Lake Trail-head is located within Byers Lake Campground, which is a convenient ending or starting point.

References

External links
 Alaska State Trails Program
 Alaska Hike Search

Geography of Matanuska-Susitna Borough, Alaska
Hiking trails in Alaska